Ezekiel "Zeke" Stane is a supervillain appearing in American comic books published by Marvel Comics as the son of Obadiah Stane and an enemy of Iron Man. Created by writer Matt Fraction and artist Barry Kitson, he first appeared in The Order #10 (April 2008).

Characterization
Zeke Stane is the son of Obadiah Stane, and has been building bioweaponry and manufacturing next-generation weapons for terrorists and supervillains since he was nine. Though he is the son of Obadiah, as well as a supervillain rather than a hero, Ezekiel Stane's creator, Matt Fraction, considers Zeke to be the next generation of Tony Stark/Iron Man rather than of Obadiah Stane/Iron Monger: often referring to the character as "Tony Stark/Iron Man 2.0".

Fraction states the similarities between the pair's characteristics with Ezekiel being evolution of Tony Stark's character: a younger, smarter, sharper futurist of a post-national supercorporate world moving into a future that Stark has no control over. Overtaking Stark and his Iron Man technology by not taking the route of armored suits but upgrading the human body itself.

Fraction often describes the contrast between the two characters using software terms, due to the character's technological basis.

Publication history
Ezekiel "Zeke" Stane first appeared in Matt Fraction's critically acclaimed book The Order #8 (April 2008) where he was drawn by Barry Kitson.

Fictional character biography

Zeke Stane is the son of Obadiah Stane who was revealed to be the behind-the-scenes manipulator pulling the strings of other villains, including Black Dahlias, Maul and M.A.N. from S.H.A.D.O.W. Androids, who have set out to destroy The Order. The Order being Tony Stark's showcase Initiative team of California, Zeke targets them as the first part of his revenge on Tony Stark for the death of his father Obadiah.

In the final issue of The Order, #10, Stane meets Iron Man face-to-face for the first time ever. Due to Stane's life off the grid, Iron Man fails to realize who he actually is, even with Stark's resources as Director of S.H.I.E.L.D., and Stane subsequently leaves California and prepares for the next stage in his vendetta against Stark.

Fraction would follow The Order with a new monthly on-going Invincible Iron Man title, with Zeke Stane appearing in its first story arc "The Five Nightmares" to further his vendetta against Tony Stark. Zeke is first seen attending a meeting with the Board of Directors of a big tobacco company who had hired him to tweak their tobacco to produce a higher basal metabolic rate in the people who smoked it: in layman's terms, they wanted him to invent a cigarette that would make users lose weight. Stane reveals he did succeed in doing it, but that he only took the job to use the company's money to make upgrades for the biotechnology he put in himself, upgrading his own hypothalamus to utilize energy within the body, that Stane swiftly uses to execute the board of directors with energy blasts from his finger tips. Stane is then updated by his girlfriend/assistant Sasha on his upgraded African suicide bombers who were test subjects of Stane's biotechnology. The attacks of his suicide bombers were something that neither Iron Man nor War Machine could have predicted. Stane meets with Stark a second time (with Stane saying his name to Stark) during a party moments before suicide bombers appeared and self-destructed. Stark was able to summon his Iron Man armor while Stane just stood there with a disturbing smile. The explosion also severely injured Pepper Potts in the process.

Stane ultimately confronts Stark with his own unique armor, while also using terrorists armed with his technology to attack Stark Industries facilities around the world. However, Stark defeats Stane's plan with his control of all of his various Iron Man armors, allowing him to be in multiple locations and neutralize all of Stane's bombs at once. Stark then disables all of Stane's tech and both of their armors with electromagnetic pulses and defeats the younger man in hand-to-hand combat. Stark delivers the final emotional blow to the defeated Stane by telling him that "your father [Obadiah] was smarter than you. And harder to beat." However, Stark is left disturbed by Stane's attack, particularly with the notion of what he may have to become to face the future Stane represents.

Zeke Stane had been visited a few times in his prison sentence and was "paroled" by the Mandarin, Sasha's father, to now employ Zeke with Tony Stark being informed after the fact. Later, Zeke used a photo of the Iron Man armor in short cut at the Daily Bugle and make it look like the hero was drunk. Also, Zeke planned along with Mandarin to use classic villains of the Armored Avenger against him, such as Chemistro, Living Laser and Mauler.

Mandarin became increasingly discontent when Stane could not build Dreadnoughts and Titanomechs on impossible schedules and nonexistent budgets. He started affecting Stane with his ring, making him obsessed with the work. Irked by this, Stane managed to remove his bomb implant and face off against Mandarin. However, Mandarin cranked up the ring's effect, making Stane his slave, causing increasing brain damage in the process. After the Mandarin succeeded in bringing Stark under his control, Tony and Zeke worked together to produce the Titanomechs.

After Mandarin used 3 of his rings to power the first Titanomech, Tony started a plan with Zeke where they convinced super villains Whirlwind, Blizzard II and Living Laser to join him in a rebellion with the final purpose of defeating Mandarin, and managed to use the technology in his body to help Resilient to find him, using microbots known as the Swarm, which tracked the repulsor technology of Tony's body. Resilient asked for help to the Triumph Division and the Dynasty to help Tony defeat Mandarin and his Titanomech. After Tim Cababa managed to reactivate the Extremis virus inside Stark's body, Tony created a link with the Swarm, and use them as bombs to destroy Mandarin's weapons, who in the end was killed by Stane.

As part of the All-New, All-Different Marvel, Zeke Stane represented Stane International when he attended a meeting at the Universal Bank with Tiberius Stone of Alchemax, Wilson Fisk of Fisk Industries, Sebastian Shaw of Shaw Industries, Darren Cross of Cross Technological Enterprises, Shingen Harada of the Yashida Corporation, Frr'dox of Shi'ar Solutions Consolidated, and Wilhelmina Kensington of Kilgore Arms where they discussed with Dario Agger about his and Roxxon Energy Corporation's plans to exploit the Ten Realms of Asgard. Zeke Stane also saw the arrival of Exterminatrix of the Midas Foundation who knocked out Dario and declared herself a new member of their assembly.

He is also revealed to be the financial backer of a rebellion against T'Challa in Wakanda

Powers and abilities
Zeke Stane's genius-level intellect and considerable fortune has allowed him to cannibalize and reverse engineer Stark Tech from the black-market to upgrade his own biology, most notably his hypothalamus. Stane successfully reduced the caloric energy consumption of his body from 70% to 9% leaving him surplus energy which he uses in repulsor bolts at the end of his fingers. Other upgrades have allowed his body to vastly repair itself from injury. Despite his high intelligence, Reed Richards claims that Stane is imitative rather than innovative, as all his inventions are merely re-purposed Stark tech rather than anything he developed completely on his own. Reed uses the example that the man who invented the sandwich simply put together what already existed to produce something good rather than developing his own idea – a fault which Iron Man exploits to ultimately defeat him. However, the fact his enhancements almost defeated Iron Man makes this seem more like Richards trying to demoralize Stane than an actual, honest assessment of his intellect. Especially considering that, so far, Stane's biomechanical technology seems unique and both Richards and Stark have never shown the ability to reproduce it on any wide scale.

This excessive use of the body's energy has shown that Stane must constantly keep his body's blood sugar level high to make up for its rapid consumption. Stane does this by eating a high (20,000) calorie paste.

In other media

Television
Ezekiel Stane appears in the Marvel Future Avengers episode "Secret Past of Iron Man", voiced by Yohei Azakami in Japanese and Benjamin Diskin in English.

Film
 While developing the story and rewriting Zak Penn's script for the Marvel Cinematic Universe (MCU) film The Avengers, director Joss Whedon became concerned that Tom Hiddleston's Loki would not be enough of a match for the Avengers, leading him to write a draft featuring Ezekiel Stane as a supporting antagonist since his father Obadiah Stane was previously killed in the preceding MCU film Iron Man. Ultimately, Ezekiel did not make it into the final draft due to producer Kevin Feige's opinion.
 Ezekiel Stane appears in Iron Man: Rise of Technovore, voiced by Miyu Irino in the Japanese version and by Eric Bauza in the English dub. He and his assistant Sasha Hammer send the Raiders to disrupt the Howard satellite and taunt Tony Stark as well as create the "Technovore" utilizing A.I.M. funding. Ezekiel is confronted by Iron Man, but he paralyzes him with Technovore and details his plan to replace humanity with his new technology by using the Howard satellite to eliminate all human life on Earth. Upon being arrested by S.H.I.E.L.D., Ezekiel is betrayed by the Technovore, which takes over his body to fight Iron Man and War Machine. Iron Man defeats Technovore by destroying the Howard satellite while a comatose Ezekiel is re-taken into S.H.I.E.L.D. custody.

Video games
Ezekiel Stane appears as an occasional boss in Iron Man 3: The Official Game, voiced by Tom Wayland. His mother withheld information about his father until the latter died and Ezekiel received his inheritance. He later works with A.I.M., Aldrich Killian / MODOK, and the Living Laser to capture Pepper Potts before Ezekiel is killed by Iron Man.

References

External links
 Zeke Stane at Marvel Wiki
 Zeke Stane at Comic Vine
 "A Stark Contrast: Fraction talks “Invincible Iron Man”" by Dave Richards, Staff Writer comicbookresources.com
 Comic Book Review: Invincible Iron Man #1 by Rokk Krinn

Fictional businesspeople
Marvel Comics scientists
Marvel Comics supervillains
Marvel Comics cyborgs
Comics characters introduced in 2008
Characters created by Matt Fraction